The Old Naval Observatory is a historic site at 23rd and E Street in Northwest, Washington, D.C.  It is where the United States Naval Observatory was located from 1844 to 1893, when it moved to its present grounds.  The original observatory building, built 1839-40, still stands, and is a designated National Historic Landmark. The Washington meridian of 1850 passes through the Observatory.  The property for many years housed the Navy's Bureau of Medicine and Surgery, which moved out in 2012.  The property has been taken over by the State Department.

It was declared a National Historic Landmark in 1965.

History

Observatory 
The observatory operated from 1844 to 1893 when it was closed in favor of a new U.S. Naval Observatory facility on Massachusetts Avenue. The Moons of Mars were discovered from this site in 1877.

The building and grounds were retained by the U.S. Navy, which first used it to house the Naval Museum of Hygiene from 1894 to 1902.

Naval Medical Hospital and National Institute of Health 

Beginning in 1903, the Naval Medical Hospital was constructed on the grounds, and it remained in use until 1942, when hospital operations were transferred to the National Naval Medical Center in Bethesda, Maryland.

The U.S. Public Health Service Hygienic Laboratory, later the National Institutes of Health, moved to the campus in 1904 from the Marine Hospital in Stapleton, Staten Island.  Five buildings would be built: the North Building in 1904, an animal house in 1915, the Central Building in 1919, and the Administration and South Buildings in 1934.  In 1938, NIH moved to a new campus in Bethesda, Maryland.

Navy Bureau of Medicine and Surgery and CIA 
The facility housed the Navy's Bureau of Medicine and Surgery from 1942 until 2012.  The Office of Strategic Services was located on the campus as was the Central Intelligence Agency until 1961.

In 1963, multiple buildings were demolished to construct the E Street Expressway.

Department of State 
The grounds and observatory are closed to the public. The entire Navy Hill is being transferred to the United States Department of State due to Base Realignment and Closure, and the Navy will be moving out. The Central Intelligence Agency's forerunner, the Office of Strategic Services was a tenant on the Hill during World War II, and the United States Public Health Service had a hospital there.

In 2014, the Department of State began expanding into the Navy Hill. A joint venture consisting of the architectural firms of Goody, Clancy and the Louis Berger Group won a $2.5 million contract in January 2014 to begin planning the renovation of the buildings on the  Navy Hill campus.

See also
 List of astronomical observatories

References

External links

Infrastructure completed in 1843
Astronomical observatories in Washington, D.C.
Buildings of the United States government in Washington, D.C.
Buildings of the United States Navy
Foggy Bottom
National Historic Landmarks in Washington, D.C.
Historic American Buildings Survey in Washington, D.C.
1843 establishments in Washington, D.C.
Closed installations of the United States Navy